Laurie Anne Maria White (born January 10, 1978), professionally known as Taya Parker, is an American reality TV show contestant known for winning the VH1 reality television show Rock of Love Bus with Bret Michaels.

Career

Modeling 
Parker was Penthouse Magazine's Pet of the Year in 2009.
In the spring of 2014 Parker appeared on the cover and was featured in a 12-page pictorial of the exclusive lifestyle entertainment for men magazine, Bizsu.

Las Vegas shows/awards 
Parker hosted and starred in the magic show "Centerfolds of Magic" at the Plaza Hotel and Casino in downtown Las Vegas.

Exotic Dancer magazine selected Parker their 2007 Entertainer of the Year in Las Vegas Nevada.

English entertainment reporter and writer Robin Leach has reviewed and featured Parker several times in the free alternative weekly newspaper Las Vegas Weekly.

Movie roles 
Parker played the lead role of Stacy Phelps, in the 2016 horror film You Found Me. Parker replaced Kathryn Eastwood, daughter of Clint Eastwood for the lead role.
In the 2013 film Pro Wrestlers vs Zombies, Parker plays herself as the on-screen former love interest of wrestler Shane Douglas.

Television/radio 
Parker has appeared and been a guest on the national television and radio shows: Larry King Live and The Opie and Anthony Show.

In 2016, Parker co-hosted one segment of the television show Out n About. The show aired on ABC American Broadcasting Company and The CW.

Personal life 
Parker was married under her given name, Laurie Mull on 7/16/98.
She divorced as Laurie A M White on 3/29/02.
Parker and Bret Michaels dated briefly after her appearance and win on his reality show Rock of Love.
Parker married for a second time under Laurie Anne Maria White on 10/6/18.

References

External links 

American female adult models
Living people
Penthouse Pets of the Year
Penthouse Pets
1978 births
Participants in American reality television series
21st-century American women